A fin is an appendage used to produce lift and thrust or to steer while traveling in water, air, or other fluid media.

Fin, FIN, or Fins may also refer to:

Biology 
 Fish fin, an anatomical feature of fish
 Fin fish, fish that possess fins
 Fin whale (Balaenoptera physalus)

People 
 Fín (died 604), Gaelic princess, wife of Oswiu of Northumbria
 Finns, people from Finland
 Fin Bartels (born 1987), German football midfielder
 Fin Donnelly (born 1966), Canadian politician
 Fin Dow-Smith, (born 1988), British songwriter
 Fin Leavell, American musician
 Fin Taylor, (born 1990), English stand-up comedian
 Fin Wilson (1888–1959), American professional baseball pitcher
 Henri Fin (born 1950), French cyclist

Legendary and fictional characters 
 Fin (comics), the name of two characters from Marvel Comics
 Fin (troll), in Danish legend
 Fin the Whale, the mascot of the Vancouver Canucks
 Fin Tutuola, a fictional character on the TV drama Law & Order: Special Victims Unit

Places 
 Fin, Iran, a city
 Fins, Somme, a commune in France
 Fin District, Iran
 Fin Garden, in Kashan, Iran
 Fin Island, in British Columbia, Canada
 Fin Rural District, Iran
 Finland

Music 
 Fin (band), an English indie rock band
 Fin (John Talabot album), 2012
 Fin (Syd album), 2017
 "Fin" (song), a 2006 song by Supergrass
 "Fin", 1986 song by Akina Nakamori
 "Fin", by Christie Front Drive from Christie Front Drive, 1997
 "Fins" (song), a 1979 song by American singer Jimmy Buffett
 "(*Fin)", a song by Anberlin from their 2007 album Cities

Sport 
 Federazione Italiana Nuoto, the Italian Swimming Federation
 Miami Dolphins, an American football team
 Surfboard fin, a hydrofoil mounted at the tail of a surfboard
 Swimfin, a fin-like shoe used to help movement through the water

Technology 
 Fin (extended surface), on a radiator
 Fin (submarine), a tower-like structure on the topside surface of submarines
 Finnair, a Finnish airline

Other uses
 Fin (geology), narrow, residual walls of hard sedimentary rock 
 Finnish language, by ISO 639-2 language code
 The Australian Financial Review, an Australian business newspaper
 Facility ID number, assigned by the United States Federal Communications Commission
 Force identification number
 Internationalist League of Norway
 United States five-dollar bill

See also
 Finn (disambiguation)
 Fin de siècle (disambiguation)
 Tail fin (disambiguation)